The 2015 United Bowl was the seventh title game of the Indoor Football League (IFL). It was played on July 11, 2015, at the Denny Sanford PREMIER Center in Sioux Falls, South Dakota. The highest seed in the United Conference was the Sioux Falls Storm, who defeated the highest seed in the Intense Conference, the Nebraska Danger, 62–27.

Road to the United Bowl

2015 Indoor Football League season
United Bowl
Sioux Falls Storm
Nebraska Danger
2015 in sports in South Dakota
Sports competitions in South Dakota
July 2015 sports events in the United States
2015 in sports in Nebraska